United Nations Security Council Resolution 19, adopted on February 27, 1947, created a sub-committee of three members to examine all the facts involved in the dispute between the United Kingdom and Albania over the Corfu Channel incident and to make a report to the Council no later than March 10, 1947.  Two British vessels were sunk by mines in the Straits on October 22, 1946.

The resolution passed with 8 votes, with three abstentions from Poland, the Soviet Union and Syria.

See also
 List of United Nations Security Council Resolutions 1 to 100 (1946–1953)
 United Nations Security Council Resolution 22

References
 Text of the Resolution at undocs.org

External links
 

 0019
1947 in the United Kingdom
 0019
 0019
1947 in Albania
Albania–United Kingdom relations
February 1947 events
Corfu Channel incident